Hebballi is a village in Bagalkot district in Karnataka.

References
AMS Maps of India and Pakistan

Villages in Bagalkot district